Luke Watkins (born 27 November 1989) is an English professional boxer who held the Commonwealth cruiserweight title from 2017 to 2018.

Professional career

Watkins made his professional debut on 20 September 2014, scoring a fourth-round technical knockout (TKO) victory over David Vicena at the Wembley Arena in London.

After compiling a record of 11–0 (7 KOs) he faced Robin Dupre for the vacant Commonwealth cruiserweight title on 7 October 2017 at the York Hall in London. Watkins knocked his opponent down in round four before securing a sixth-round TKO to capture his first professional title. His first defence came two months later against Mike Stafford on 2 December at the Leicester Arena. After encountering some difficulties in the first few rounds, Watkins began to take control midway through the fight, opening a cut below Stafford's eye in the sixth round. At the end of the seventh, Stafford's corner warned their man that they would call off the fight to save him from further punishment. Seeing no improvements from Stafford, his corner called a halt to the contest at the end of the eighth round, awarding Watkins a stoppage win by corner retirement (RTD).

His second defence came against WBA Continental Cruiserweight champion and 2016 Olympian, Lawrence Okolie, on 6 June 2018 at York Hall in London, with Okolie's WBA title also on the line. Watkins suffered two knockdowns in the third round, the second of which promoted referee Michael Alexander to call a halt to the contest, handing Watkins the first defeat of his career to lose his Commonwealth title by TKO.

His next fight was against Isaac Chamberlain – who also lost to Okolie in his previous fight – on 27 October 2018 at the Copper Box Arena in London. After a hard-fought ten rounds, Watkins suffered his second defeat, losing via points decision (PTS). Referee Kieran McCann scored the bout 95–94 in favour of Chamberlain, with the defining factor being a late knockdown scored by Chamberlain in the final seconds of the tenth and final round.

Professional boxing record

References

External links

Luke Watkins' official website

Living people
1989 births
English male boxers
Sportspeople from Swindon
Cruiserweight boxers
Commonwealth Boxing Council champions